Omphalophana anatolica is a moth of the family Noctuidae first described by Julius Lederer in 1857. It is found in south-eastern Europe, the Near East and Middle East.

Adults are on wing from March to May. There is one generation per year.

External links

Species info

Cuculliinae
Moths of Europe
Moths of Asia
Moths of the Middle East
Moths described in 1857